Vanadium hexacarbonyl is the inorganic compound with the formula V(CO)6. It is a blue-black volatile solid. This highly reactive species is noteworthy from theoretical perspectives as a rare isolable homoleptic metal carbonyl that is paramagnetic. Most species with the formula Mx(CO)y follow the 18-electron rule, whereas V(CO)6 has 17 valence electrons.

Synthesis 
In the first step, VCl3 is reduced with metallic sodium under 200 atm CO at 160 °C. The solvent for this reduction is typically diglyme, CH3OCH2CH2OCH2CH2OCH3. This triether solubilizes sodium salts, akin to the behavior of a crown ether:
4 Na + VCl3 + 6 CO + 2 diglyme → [Na(diglyme)2][V(CO)6] + 3 NaCl
The resulting anion is oxidized with acid:
2  + 2 H3PO4 → 2 V(CO)6 + H2 + 2

Reactions 
Vanadium hexacarbonyl is thermally unstable. Its primary reaction is reduction to the monoanion , salts of which are well studied. It is also susceptible to substitution by tertiary phosphine ligands, often leading to disproportionation.

V(CO)6 reacts with sources of the cyclopentadienyl anion to give the orange four-legged piano stool complex (C5H5)V(CO)4 (m.p. 136 °C). Like many charge-neutral organometallic compounds, this half-sandwich species is volatile.

Structure
V(CO)6 adopts an octahedral coordination geometry and is isostructural with chromium hexacarbonyl, even though they have differing valence electron counts. High resolution X-ray crystallography indicates that the molecule is slightly distorted with two (axial) shorter V–C distances of 1.993(2) Å vs. four (equatorial) 2.005(2) Å.

References

Further reading
 Original synthesis: 

Vanadium compounds
Carbonyl complexes